In mathematics, Busemann's theorem is a theorem in Euclidean geometry and geometric tomography. It was first proved by Herbert Busemann in 1949 and was motivated by his theory of area in Finsler spaces.

Statement of the theorem

Let K be a convex body in n-dimensional Euclidean space Rn containing the origin in its interior. Let S be an (n − 2)-dimensional linear subspace of Rn. For each unit vector θ in S⊥, the orthogonal complement of S, let Sθ denote the (n − 1)-dimensional hyperplane containing θ and S. Define r(θ) to be the (n − 1)-dimensional volume of K ∩ Sθ.  Let C be the curve {θr(θ)} in S⊥.  Then C forms the boundary of a convex body in S⊥.

See also
 Brunn–Minkowski inequality
 Prékopa–Leindler inequality

References

 
 

Euclidean geometry
Geometric inequalities
Theorems in convex geometry